The Cricketers of My Time is a memoir of cricket, nominally written by the former Hambledon cricketer John Nyren about the players of the late 18th century, most of whom he knew personally.  Nyren, who had no recognised literary skill, collaborated with the eminent Shakespearean scholar Charles Cowden Clarke to produce his work.  It is believed that Cowden Clarke recorded Nyren's verbal reminiscences and so "ghosted" the text.

The work became a major source for the history and personalities of Georgian cricket and has also come to be regarded as the first classic in cricket's now rich literary history.  Writing in 1957, John Arlott described it as "still the finest study of cricket and cricketers ever written".

Publications
The Cricketers of My Time was first published in serial form by a weekly London newspaper called The Town in 1832.  The following year, the series with some modifications appeared as the second part of an instructional book entitled The Young Cricketer's Tutor, which was also the title of the book's first part.  There was a third part called A Few Memoranda Respecting the Progress of Cricket and that is generally referred to as the Memoranda.  The first edition of the full book was published by Effingham Wilson of the Royal Exchange, London in June 1833, and was reviewed by the Rev. John Mitford for The Gentleman's Magazine in July 1833.

John Nyren died in 1837, but there was a second edition of the book in 1840 followed by eleven subsequent editions to 1855. These editions were retitled Nyren's Cricketers Guide.  A further edition, with introduction, footnotes and appendices by F. S. Ashley-Cooper, was published by Gay & Bird in 1902.  In 1907, there was another edition produced by E. V. Lucas titled The Hambledon Men.  Lucas' edition included Mitford's review and the interview by James Pycroft of Billy Beldham, one of Nyren's particular heroes, as well as pieces by Arthur Haygarth and Mary Russell Mitford, accompanied by Lucas's own commentary on the source material.

In 1996, during researches for his Hambledon book The Glory Days of Cricket, Ashley Mote discovered a handwritten manuscript of The Cricketers of My Time which was signed and dated March 1833.  A forensic examination was undertaken to determine the age of the manuscript and proved that it was written within a few years at most of that date, which was three months after the serial in The Town concluded and three months before the first edition of The Young Cricketer's Tutor was published.  In addition, a handwriting analysis verified that neither Nyren nor Cowden Clarke wrote the manuscript, which is believed to have been the work of a professional copyist using a steel-nib pen.  There are a number of differences between the serial and the manuscript, but the version in the book's first edition has only minor differences from the manuscript.

In 1998, Mote published his findings in a new version of The Cricketers of My Time which compares the serial with both the manuscript and the first edition.

Value as a source
Much of historical, social and literary value can be gleaned from Nyren's work in which his essential purpose was to provide biographical information about the players whom he knew and remembered.  For the most part, they were associated with the Hambledon Club and played for Hampshire, but he also talked about cricketers from Surrey and Kent who were Hampshire's usual opponents, sometimes in the form of an All-England team.  Nyren is now regarded as a key source for information about these players.

John Small
Nyren had great admiration for master batsman John Small, whose son Jack Small seems to have been his best friend.  In his appraisal of John Small senior, Nyren says:

the name of John Small, the elder, shines among them (the contemporary players) in all the lustre of a star of the first magnitude.

John Small, who scored the earliest known century in first-class cricket, was certainly a major reason for Hampshire's success in the Hambledon era.

Richard Nyren
Nyren says much about his own father, Richard Nyren, who was the Hambledon Club captain, including a description of him as "(the finest) specimen of the thorough-bred old English yeoman".  Although John Nyren was at pains to show undue respect, almost amounting to obsequious fawning where social superiors were concerned (especially the unsavoury Lord Frederick Beauclerk), he tells of his father "maintaining an opinion with great firmness against the 3rd Duke of Dorset and Sir Horatio Mann and being proved right".  But while his father reportedly stood up to aristocrats, John Nyren himself resorted to "social grovelling" via the addition to his text of "ingratiating remarks addressed to the great and powerful".

The "monster bat" incident
The Memoranda seems to have been added hastily and is not generally seen as providing much value, but it does include the following:

Several years since (I do not recollect the precise date) a player, named White, of Ryegate (sic), brought a bat to a match, which being the width of the stumps, effectually defended his wicket from the bowler : and, in consequence, a law was passed limiting the future width of the bat to 4¼ inches.  Another law was decreed that the ball should not weigh less than 5½ oz, or more than 5¾ oz.

The Laws of cricket still stipulate the limit on the width of the bat that was agreed by the Hambledon Club as a result of the "Monster Bat Incident".  While Nyren, a boy at the time of the incident in 1771, may have thought that White was cheating, it is now believed that he forced an issue as the modern straight bats were a recent innovation, replacing the original hockey-stick shape, and no standard dimensions had as yet been agreed.

Lamborn
One of Nyren's most vivid biographical sketches is his chapter on Lamborn, who was clearly a ripe character.  But this chapter has significance for cricket's history and evolution as Lamborn was evidently the originator of the underarm off-break.  Nyren says:

He was a bowler – right-handed, and he had the most extraordinary delivery I ever saw.  The ball was delivered quite low, and with a twist (sic) ; not like that of the generality of right-handed bowlers, but just the reverse way : that is, if bowling to a right-handed hitter, his ball would twist from the off stump into the leg.

While the "general" way for an overarm bowler to spin the ball is from off to leg (i.e., an off-break), the opposite was true for the underarm bowlers and Lamborn was thus one of bowling's great innovators.  The pitched delivery was still new, having been introduced in the 1760s, when Lamborn played (i.e., his known career was from 1777 to 1781).  Until the 1760s, bowlers had always rolled or skimmed the ball towards the batsman so spin bowling itself was a new skill.  Nyren consistently refers to "spin" as "twist".

Legacy
The Cricketers of My Time lacks structure and is often disjointed to the extent that it resembles "a couple of old cricketers on Test Match Special reminiscing about the great players of the past".  Nevertheless, it remains an "extraordinarily vivid, exciting and unique book".  Unless new sources of information about Georgian cricket should come to light, "nothing could hope to replace the charm of the account of those great days handed down to us by John Nyren".  David Underdown called it "a wonderfully evocative, nostalgic account of the (Hambledon) Club's great days in the 1770s and 1780s.

Harry Altham pointed out that the book was written some forty to fifty years after the zenith of Hambledon and so "it is not to be wondered at" that Nyren was often "vague as to detail and very sparing of date and place".  Altham calls Nyren the "Herodotus, and not the Thucydides, of cricket" and writes of Nyren's ability to "make his characters live more vividly".

Rowland Bowen, often a prickly critic of other writers, described The Cricketers of My Time as "the locus classicus for late eighteenth century cricket personalities" and added that "the book is outstanding as literature".  Bowen was convinced that Cowden Clarke was the author and had used Nyren's spoken reminiscences as his source.  Bowen wrote that "Clarke makes us hear the very sound of the old man himself talking".  Underdown said that it is "not important" who wrote the actual text as "in either case it originated with Nyren".

Apart from the biographical information for which it is invaluable, the book contains other pieces of information that are useful and sometimes original.  For example, Nyren is the first writer to mention boundaries in a cricketing context, although it meant something different then as they were parallel lines in single wicket matches used to define the limits of the outfield.

A noted counterpoint in Nyren's work is his eulogy of the Hambledon era against his contempt for the roundarm era which began a few years before The Cricketers of My Time was published.  Nyren made several references to roundarm as "throwing".  In short, he "reckoned the game had been ruined by allowing roundarm".  According to Altham, Nyren was one of the foremost critics of roundarm along with William Ward and Thomas Lord.  Altham recounts how Nyren stated in his first edition, in the section headed "Protest", that Nyren prophesied: "the elegant and scientific game of cricket will degenerate into a mere exhibition of rough, coarse horseplay!"

Plagiarism
Mote's 1998 edition of the book begins with an introduction in which he outlines the discovery of the manuscript and the actions that followed up to publication of the new version.  In addition, he criticised Nyren's work and pointed out the plagiarism that is evident in the part called The Young Cricketer's Tutor.  Mote believes that Nyren included this piece to add bulk to what would otherwise have been a slim volume.

There is no evidence of plagiarism in The Cricketers of My Time itself (or in the short Memoranda) which contains "such qualities of spontaneity that they might almost have been taken from dictation straight onto the page".

In 1801, Thomas Boxall published Rules and Instructions for Playing at the Game of Cricket and this was "the first attempt to set laws, methods and tactics down on paper".  The work, which had less than 6,000 words, was revised and reprinted several times to 1804 and was well received.  In 1816, the writer John Baxter published Instructions and Rules for Playing the Noble Game of Cricket under the name of William Lambert.  This was also successful and was reprinted a number of times till 1828 with a further listed edition in 1832 that has been lost.

Although Lambert was a top-class player in the Napoleonic period, he could not read or write and so Baxter was cricket's first "ghost writer".

The Lambert/Baxter book borrowed heavily from Boxall but was longer and had a structured format.  In The Young Cricketer's Tutor, Nyren blatantly copied Lambert's structure and attempted to present new content by overwriting Lambert's constructions, generally with longer sentences.

Cricketers mentioned in the book
Numerous Georgian players are described in the book but, as the newest version's editor has pointed out, there are several omissions including John Boorman, William Bowra, William Bullen, Robert Clifford, Samuel Colchin, John Edmeads, William Fennex and Richard Aubrey Veck; while other notable players such as Francis Booker, Robert Robinson and Thomas Scott receive only the briefest of mentions.

In the following table, the page numbers given are those in the newest version of the book edited by Mote in 1998.  The date published in The Town refers to the relevant sections in which each player was discussed.  The essential difference between Mote's version and the original 1833 book is that Mote arranged the parts in the order that they were written: hence, The Cricketers of My Time comes first and precedes The Young Cricketer's Tutor with the Memoranda at the end.

References

Bibliography
 HS Altham, A History of Cricket, Volume 1 (to 1914), George Allen & Unwin, 1962
 John Arlott, Arlott on Cricket, Willow Books, 1984
 Barclays World of Cricket, 3rd edition (ed. E W Swanton), Willow Books, 1986.  Article on the Hambledon era written by EDR Eagar.
 Derek Birley, A Social History of English Cricket, Aurum, 1999
 Rowland Bowen, Cricket: A History of its Growth and Development, Eyre & Spottiswoode, 1970
 Ashley Mote, The Glory Days of Cricket, Robson, 1997
 John Nyren, The Cricketers of My Time (ed. Ashley Mote), Robson, 1998
 David Underdown, Start of Play, Allen Lane, 2000

External links
 The complete text of Lucas's 1907 edition in Archive.org
 CricInfo – profile of John Nyren

Cricket books
English cricket in the 18th century
1833 books